The 1891 Harvard Crimson football team represented Harvard University in the 1891 college football season. The Crimson finished the season with a 13–1 record. The team won its first 13 games by a combined score of 588–16, but lost its final game against Yale, 10–0.

Schedule

References

Harvard
Harvard Crimson football seasons
Harvard Crimson football